Asrabad-e Tazeh (also Romanized as ‘Aşrābād-e Tāzeh and ‘Asrābād Tazeh; also known as ‘Aşrābād, ‘Asrābād-e Jadīd, ‘Aşrābād-e ‘Olyā, and Asrawa) is a village in Sarkal Rural District, in the Central District of Marivan County, Kurdistan Province, Iran. At the 2006 census, its population was 460, in 98 families. The village is populated by Kurds.

References 

Towns and villages in Marivan County
Kurdish settlements in Kurdistan Province